Grupo DPSP is the second largest Brazilian drugstore chain after RD. The company was founded in 2011 through the merger of São Paulo-based Drogaria São Paulo and Rio de Janeiro-based Drogarias Pacheco.

Brands 
The company has more than 1,200 stores in 10 Brazilian states branded as Drogaria São Paulo  and Drogarias Pacheco.

References

External links
 Official website 
 Drogaria São Paulo website 
 Drogarias  Pacheco website 

Retail companies established in 2011
Companies based in São Paulo
Pharmacies of Brazil
Pharmacy brands